David Orentlicher is an educator, physician, attorney, and an American politician.  He is a member of the Democratic Party and is the Judge Jack and Lulu Lehman Professor at UNLV William S. Boyd School of Law and co-director of the UNLV Health Law Program. He teaches courses in health care law and constitutional law. Orentlicher also has held visiting or adjunct teaching positions at Princeton University, the University of Chicago Law School, Indiana University: Robert H. McKinney School of Law, University of Iowa College of Law, and Northwestern University Medical School.

Life and career
Orentlicher graduated from Harvard Medical School and then completed an internship in internal medicine. After practicing as a family physician, he returned to Harvard Law School for his Juris Doctor. After clerking on the U.S. Court of Appeals for the Fifth Circuit, he practiced law for two years before joining the American Medical Association, where he served as Ethics and Health Policy Counsel and directed the AMA's division of medical ethics.  While there, he drafted the AMA's first ever Patients' Bill of Rights, guidelines for physician investment in health care facilities that were incorporated into federal law, and guidelines on gifts to physicians from industry that have become the industry standard and a standard recognized by the federal government. He helped develop many other positions—on end-of-life matters, organ transplantation, and reproductive issues—that have been cited by courts and government agencies in their decision-making. He is a member of the American Law Institute and a fellow of the Hastings Center, an independent bioethics research institution.

A resident of Las Vegas, Orentlicher and his wife Judy have two children, Cy and Shay.

Legislative work
In June 2020, Orentlicher won his primary for the Nevada Assembly in District 20 and had no opposition for the seat in November 2020. District 20 lies on the eastside of Las Vegas and runs into northwest Henderson. Orentlicher also served in the Indiana House from 2002 to 2008. He represented the 86th House District, which consisted of a northern portion of Indianapolis in Marion County and a small portion of Carmel in Hamilton County.

Committee membership
Assemblyman Orentlicher serves on the three committees—Health and Human Services, Judiciary, and Revenue. In Indiana, he served as Committee Chair for the Small Business & Economic Development Committee and as a member of the following committees during his six years: Ways and Means, Public Health, Education, Insurance, and Technology, Research, & Development.

References

External links
 David Orentlicher's UNLV School of Law Webpage

|-

American legal scholars
Harvard Law School alumni
Harvard Medical School alumni
Indiana University–Purdue University Indianapolis faculty
Living people
Democratic Party members of the Indiana House of Representatives
Democratic Party members of the Nevada Assembly
Politicians from Indianapolis
Year of birth missing (living people)
Hastings Center Fellows
21st-century American politicians